Terra ( [];  or ) is a village in the Paphos District of Cyprus, located 1 km north of Kritou Terra. Prior to 1974, the village was inhabited exclusively by Turkish Cypriots. In 1973, 329 Turkish Cypriots were living in Terra. , it had a population of 36.

References

Communities in Paphos District
Turkish Cypriot villages depopulated after the 1974 Turkish invasion of Cyprus